A list of windmills in the German Federal State of North Rhine-Westphalia.

References

Windmills
North Rhine-Westphalia
Tourist attractions in North Rhine-Westphalia
Windmills